Red Indian Folk and Fairy Tales is a 1960 anthology of 19 fairy tales from North American Indian culture that have been collected and retold by Ruth Manning-Sanders. It is one in a long series of such anthologies by Manning-Sanders.

Table of contents
 I. Micabo's Island
 II. Ugly Thing
 III. Star Maiden
 IV. Beaver and Porcupine
 V. Raven Boy and Little Hawk
 VI. Adventures of Rabbit
 Rabbit Goes Hunting
 Rabbit and the Devouring Hill
 Rabbit and the Thunder Birds
 VII. Zini and the Witches
 VIII. Napi and Nip
 IX. Young Mouse
 X. The Fat Grandmother
 XI. Adventures of Coyote
 Coyote and the Mice
 Coyote and the Quails
 Coyote and Mole
 Coyote and Little Blue Fox
 XII. The Magic Pebble
 XIII. Beautiful Girl
 XIV. Snake Ogre
 XV. Good Man and Bad Man
 XVI. Proud Girl and Bold Eagle
 XVII. Raven and the Wicked One
 XVIII. Otter Heart and the Magic Kettle
 XIX. Sun Arrow

See also
 Native American mythology

References

↓ Native African Spirituality 

Collections of fairy tales
Children's short story collections
1960 short story collections
American fairy tales
1960 children's books
1960 anthologies